Thomas Enqvist defeated Yevgeny Kafelnikov 6–4, 6–1 to win the 1998 Open 13 singles competition. Enqvist was the defending champion.

Seeds

  Yevgeny Kafelnikov (final)
  Richard Krajicek (semifinals)
  Sergi Bruguera (second round)
  Gustavo Kuerten (second round)
  Cédric Pioline (first round)
  Thomas Enqvist (champion)
  Albert Portas (second round)
  Julian Alonso (second round)

Draw

Finals

Top half

Bottom half

External links
 1998 Open 13 Singles draw

Singles
Open 13